NPO Zapp is the Dutch children's block from the NPO on NPO 3 that launched as Z@pp on 4 September 2005. Since September 2005, Zappelin has been the name of a block for young children. The @ in the name of the channel was removed on 10 September 2012. On 12 March 2013, the NPO announced that Zapp and Zappelin would be renamed as NPO Zapp and NPO Zappelin. The reason for this change is to make the channels and its programmes more recognizable. The rebranding completed on 19 August 2014. Together with NPO Zappelin it forms a channel called NPO Zappelin Xtra, available online and part of bonus packages (cable, satellite and IPTV).

Well-known programmes of NPO Zapp are Willem Wever (NCRV), Het Klokhuis (NTR), Jeugdjournaal (NOS) and Villa Achterwerk (VPRO).

NPO Zapp had a mascot called The Zappers.

Current programmes 
 Campus 12
 Checkpoint
 De Dokter Corrie Show
 Het Klokhuis
 Jeugdjournaal
 SpangaS: De Campus
 Taarten van Abel
 Willem Wever
 Zaai
 Zapplive
 Zappsport

Foreign series 
 Dance Academy (Australia)
 Super Abby (Spain)

References

External links
 

Television channels in the Netherlands
Netherlands Public Broadcasting
Television channels and stations established in 2005